Ferenci, Ferenczi, Ferenczy:
 Franz Ferenczy (born Friedemann)
 István Ferenczy (1792–1856), a Hungarian sculptor
 István "Stan" Ferenczi (born 1977), a Hungarian footballer
 János Ferenczi (born 1991), a Hungarian footballer
 Károly Ferenczy (1862–1917), a Hungarian Impressionist painter
 Béni Ferenczy (1890–1967), a Hungarian sculptor, graphic artist
 Sándor Ferenczi (born Fränkel, 1873–1933), a Hungarian psychoanalyst
 Zolton Ferency

See also 
 Ferenc
 Ferencsik (e.g. János Ferencsik, John Ferenzik)

Hungarian-language surnames